Sparganothoides machimiana is a species of moth of the family Tortricidae described by William Barnes and August Busck in 1920. It is found from the mountains and woodlands of Arizona, Colorado and New Mexico in the United States south to Durango in Mexico. The habitat consists of mixed forests and oak woodlands.

The length of the forewings is 8.1–10.4 mm for males and 9.2–10.8 mm for females. The ground color of the forewings is brownish yellow or golden yellow to brownish gray, with scattered brownish-orange or brown scaling. The hindwings are pale yellowish white, or yellowish gray to gray. Adults are on wing from late June to mid-September.

The larvae feed on Quercus (including Quercus hypoleucoides and Quercus emoryi) and Arctostaphylos species. They web the edges of the leaves of their host. They are reddish.

References

Moths described in 1920
Sparganothoides